State Route 304 (SR 304) is a state highway in Lander County, Nevada, United States. The road is the main street through the town of Battle Mountain, and is also designated Interstate 80 Business (I-80 Bus.). The highway was part of SR 1 and U.S. Route 40 (US 40) prior to the mid-1970s.

Route description

SR 304 begins just west of the Interstate 80 (I-80) West Battle Mountain interchange northwest of Battle Mountain. The route heads briefly passes through a portion of the Te-Moak Tribe Indian reservation as it turns southeast into the town. The highway parallels the Union Pacific Railroad right through the middle of the Battle Mountain business district. SR 304 has a junction with State Route 305, which connects to Austin in southern Lander County, as well as State Route 806, providing access to mining districts north of the town. The route exits the town limits, crossing over the Reese River before turning south to reconnect to I-80 at the East Battle Mountain interchange and terminating just south of there.

The majority of State Route 304 is also designated Interstate 80 Business, a business loop of Interstate 80.

History

Front Street in Battle Mountain was formerly part of State Route 1, a route designated with the creation of the Nevada State Highway System in 1917. The adoption of the U.S. Highway System in 1926 by the Bureau of Public Roads created US 40 in Nevada, which was also routed along Front Street through Battle Mountain. Both SR 1 and US 40 were shown on Nevada state maps as early as 1929.

The State Route 304 designation was applied to Front Street through Battle Mountain on July 1, 1976, in the renumbering of Nevada's state highways. In this process, Route 1 was removed from the state highway system. US 40 was also gone in Nevada, having mostly been replaced by the freeway that would become I-80.

Major intersections

See also

 List of state highways in Nevada
 List of highways numbered 304

References

External links

304
Transportation in Lander County, Nevada
Interstate 80